The 7th CARIFTA Games was held in Nassau, Bahamas on March 27–28, 1978.

Participation (unofficial)

Detailed result lists can be found on the "World Junior Athletics History" website.  An unofficial count yields the number of about 88 athletes (66 junior (under-20) and 22 youth (under-17)) from about 13 countries:  Anguilla (2), Antigua and Barbuda (2), Bahamas (19), Barbados (13), Bermuda (6), British Virgin Islands (1), Guadeloupe (2), Guyana (1), Jamaica (31), Martinique (1), Saint Vincent and the Grenadines (1), Trinidad and Tobago (8), Turks and Caicos Islands (1).

Austin Sealy Award

The Austin Sealy Trophy was awardeded to Mary Ann Higgs from the Bahamas.  She won 2 gold (100m and 200m), and 1 silver (400m) medal in the youth (U-17) category.

Medal summary
Medal winners are published by category: Boys under 20 (Junior), Girls under 20 (Junior), Boys under 17 (Youth), and Girls under 17 (Youth).
Complete results can be found on the "World Junior Athletics History" website.

Boys under 20 (Junior)

Girls under 20 (Junior)

Boys under 17 (Youth)

Girls under 17 (Youth)

Medal table (unofficial)

References

External links
World Junior Athletics History

CARIFTA Games
CARIFTA Games
CARIFTA Games
CARIFTA Games
International athletics competitions hosted by the Bahamas